John Ripon (fl. 1388) of York, was an English Member of Parliament.

He was a Member (MP) of the Parliament of England for City of York September 1388. He was a son of Arnold Ripon. John married, by 1381, a woman named Agnes.

References

14th-century births
Year of death missing
14th-century English people
People from York
Members of the Parliament of England (pre-1707)